Christ Church, Hampstead, is a Church of England church in Hampstead, London.  It is a church with particular connections to the old village of Hampstead and the Heath.

Former Prime Minister Clement Attlee was married to his wife, Violet Attlee, at Christ Church, Hampstead.

History

The present church was erected between 1850 and 1852 to designs by the architect Samuel Daukes in the Early English Gothic style. In 1860 a timber gallery was erected by Sir Gilbert Scott (this was dismantled in the 1960s). In 1881–82 the north porch and aisle were added to designs by Ewan Christian. The church is constructed of Kentish ragstone with Portland stone dressings and slate roofs.

In 1855 the church built a primary school adjacent, originally for infants. By the post-World War II period the school catered to kindergarten (ages 3 – 5) and primary (ages 5 – 11) mixed gender students, organized as one class per year. This was one of many such church-associated schools in the area.

Vicars

John Pelham 1852 - 1855
Edward Bickersteth 1855 - 1885
George Frederick Head 1885 - 1897
George Sidney Streatfeild 1898 - 1901
Alfred Edwin Deacon 1901 - 1917
Thomas Brocas Waters 1917 - 1922
Osmond Ralph Maude Roxby 1923 - 1936
John Farquhar Richardson 1936 - 1941
Frank Hay Gillingham 1941 - 1942
Sydney James Nisbet Wallace 1942 - 1953
David Thomas Jarvis 1953 - 1969
John Alfred Sampford 1969 - 1979
Christopher John Fairfax Scott 1979 - 1995
Paul Derick Conrad 1995 - current

Bells
The church has a ring of eight bells, the heaviest of which weighs in at 24cwt.  They were installed in 2005 after Michael Royalton-Kisch, the current tower captain, single-handedly raised £100,000 to replace the old, unsafe bells.  The current band practices on a Wednesday evening at 7pm, and rings for most Sunday services.

The treble, tenor, third and fifth bells were the work of Gillett & Johnston, adopted from St Luke's in Cowley, Oxford.  The remaining four bells were cast by Whitechapel Bell Foundry in 2005.

Organ

The church had an organ installed in 1857 by the celebrated builder Henry Willis who also became the church's first organist. The organ has since been replaced. In about 1968 dry rot was found directly above the organ and to repair the damage the organ had to be partly dismantled. It was stored in the church but was never re-assembled. At some point after this it was taken away and stored (possibly by the organ builders Mander). After some trials of the Allen computer organ, a smaller 2 manual tracker action instrument was installed at the rear of the church.
The BBC visited the church and chose to broadcast their Morning Service soon after, however the Willis organ that they heard on their 'scouting' visit had been dismantled by the time they came to broadcast live.

There have been a number of famous organists including:

Walter Brooks
Henry Willis 1852 - 1859
Henry Parratt 1859 – ???? (formerly organist of St. Paul's Church, Huddersfield)
John Charles Ward 1863 - 1868
Dr. Marshall of Kidderminster 1868
Charles John Vincent  1883 – 1891 (formerly organist of St Eustachius' Church, Tavistock)
Henry Walford Davies 1891 - 1898
Cyril Rootham  1898 - 1901
 Ian Graham ? - 1964
 Gordon Whittard c 1964 - 1974?

References

Hampstead
Grade II listed churches in London
Churches completed in 1852
19th-century Church of England church buildings
Diocese of London
Buildings and structures in Hampstead
1852 establishments in England
Grade II listed buildings in the London Borough of Camden
Ewan Christian buildings